Ilybius chalconatus is a species of beetle native to the Palearctic, including Europe, the Near East and North Africa. In Europe, it is found in Austria, Belgium, Bosnia and Herzegovina, Britain, Bulgaria, Corsica, Crete, Croatia, the Czech Republic, mainland Denmark, Estonia, Finland, mainland France, Germany, mainland Greece, Hungary, Ireland, mainland Italy, Kaliningrad, Latvia, Lithuania, Luxembourg, Moldova, North Macedonia, Poland, mainland Portugal, Russia (Central, East and Northwest), Sardinia, Sicily, Slovakia, Slovenia, mainland Spain, Sweden, Switzerland, the Netherlands, Ukraine, and Yugoslavia.

References

External links

Ilybius chalconatus at Fauna Europaea

chalconatus
Beetles described in 1797